Santa Perpètua de Mogoda is a municipality (comarca) of Vallès Occidental in 
Catalonia.

See also
Municipal elections in Santa Perpètua de Mogoda

References

 Panareda Clopés, Josep Maria; Rios Calvet, Jaume; Rabella Vives, Josep Maria (1989). Guia de Catalunya, Barcelona: Caixa de Catalunya.  (Catalan).

External links 
Official website 
 Government data pages 

Municipalities in Vallès Occidental